Sean Russell Poppen (born March 15, 1994) is an American professional baseball pitcher in the San Diego Padres organization. He has previously played in Major League Baseball (MLB) for the Minnesota Twins, Pittsburgh Pirates, Tampa Bay Rays and Arizona Diamondbacks.

Career
Poppen attended Cape Henry Collegiate in Virginia Beach, Virginia. He attended Harvard University for four years (2013 through 2016), and played college baseball for the Crimson.

Minnesota Twins
Poppen was drafted by the Minnesota Twins in the 19th round, with the 573rd overall selection, of the 2016 MLB draft. He spent the 2016 season with the Elizabethton Twins and the Cedar Rapids Kernels. In 2017, he played for Cedar Rapids and the Fort Myers Miracle. His 2018 was split between Fort Myers and the Chattanooga Lookouts. He split the 2019 minor league season between the Pensacola Blue Wahoos and the Rochester Red Wings, going a combined 7–4 with a 4.01 ERA over 89.2 innings.

On June 19, 2019, his contract was selected and he was called up to the major leagues for the first time. He made his debut that night versus the Boston Red Sox. He posted a 0–0 record with a 7.56 ERA over 8.1 innings for the Twins in 2019. Poppen finished the 2019 season on the injured list with elbow inflammation.

Poppen was designated for assignment by the Twins on September 29, 2020, when Alex Kirilloff was selected to the 40-man roster. With the 2020 Minnesota Twins, Poppen appeared in 6 games, compiling a 0-0 record with 4.70 ERA and 10 strikeouts in 7.2 innings pitched.

Pittsburgh Pirates
On October 1, 2020, Poppen was claimed off waivers by the Pittsburgh Pirates. Poppen recorded a 7.71 ERA in 3 appearances before being designated for assignment on May 13, 2021.

Tampa Bay Rays
On May 18, 2021, Poppen was traded to the Tampa Bay Rays in exchange for cash considerations. He was designated for assignment on July 30, 2021.

Arizona Diamondbacks
On August 2, 2021, Poppen was claimed off of waivers by the Arizona Diamondbacks. He finished the season appearing in 20 games for Arizona, registering a 1-1 record and 4.67 ERA with 21 strikeouts in 17.1 innings pitched.

In 2022, Poppen made 29 appearances for the Diamondbacks, pitching to a 2-2 record and 4.40 ERA with 22 strikeouts in 28.2 innings of work.

San Diego Padres
On December 2, 2022, Poppen was claimed off waivers by the San Diego Padres.  On January 20, 2023, Poppen was removed from the 40-man roster and sent outright to the Triple-A El Paso Chihuahuas.

Personal life
In 2016 Poppen graduated (with honors) from Harvard, double majoring in Chemistry and Physics, and Engineering Sciences.

He is married to Taylor Mae Poppen, a 2015 Harvard graduate, and together they have a son and newborn daughter. They live in the Buckhead neighborhood of Atlanta, Georgia.

References

External links

Harvard Crimson bio

Living people
1994 births
Sportspeople from Chesapeake, Virginia
Baseball players from Virginia
Major League Baseball pitchers
Minnesota Twins players
Pittsburgh Pirates players
Tampa Bay Rays players
Arizona Diamondbacks players
Harvard Crimson baseball players
Elizabethton Twins players
Cedar Rapids Kernels players
Fort Myers Miracle players
Chattanooga Lookouts players
Pensacola Blue Wahoos players
Rochester Red Wings players
Indianapolis Indians players
Durham Bulls players
Duluth Huskies players